Erin Manning (born 1969) is a Canadian cultural theorist and political philosopher as well as a practicing artist in the areas of dance, fabric design, and interactive installation. Manning's research spans the fields of art, political theory, and philosophy. She received her Ph.D in Political Philosophy from University of Hawaii in 2000. She currently teaches in the Concordia University Fine Arts Faculty.

Work
Manning is founder and director of the SenseLab, a research-creation laboratory affiliated with Hexagram: Institute for Research/Creation in Media Arts and Technology in Montreal. She collaborates with Brian Massumi. They co-edit a book series at MIT Press entitled Technologies of Lived Abstraction and are founding members of the editorial collective of the Sense Lab journal Inflexions: A Journal of Research Creation.

Manning frequently gives workshops and lectures at universities and other institutions, including but not limited to the Zürcher Hochschule der Künste (Zurich University of the Arts) (with Brian Massumi), the European Graduate School in Saas-Fee, the Dance Bar (International Dance Programme) in Sweden, and the University of California at Berkeley.

Bibliography

 Ephemeral Territories: Representing Nation, Home, and Identity in Canada (University of Minnesota Press, 2003)
 Politics of Touch: Sense, Movement, Sovereignty (University of Minnesota Press, 2007)
 Relationscapes: Movement, Art, Philosophy (MIT Press, 2009)
 Always More Than One: Individuation's Dance (Duke University Press, 2013)
 Thought in the Act: Passages in the Ecology of Experience (with Brian Massumi; University of Minnesota Press, 2014)
 The Minor Gesture (Duke University Press, 2016)

References

External links
Erinmovement.com Personal website with news and art/research project descriptions.
The SenseLab.
Inflexions: A Journal for Research-Creation.
Technologies of Lived Abstraction MIT Press book series.

1969 births
Living people
Canadian multimedia artists
Mass media theorists
North American cultural studies
University of Hawaiʻi at Mānoa alumni
Academic staff of European Graduate School
Academic staff of Concordia University
Canadian women philosophers
Political philosophers
Canadian women artists
21st-century Canadian philosophers